Shaddock may refer to:

 Pomelo, fruit Citrus maxima
 NATO codenames for Soviet missiles:
 P-5 Pyatyorka (SS-N-3 Shaddock)
 SPU-35V Redut (SSC-1B Shaddock)

People 
 Bob Shaddock (1920–1991), American professional basketball player

See also 
 Les Shadoks animated television series from France
 Shad, fish subfamily Alosinae